Abu Abd Allah al-Mughira ibn Shu'ba ibn Abi Amir ibn Mas'ud al-Thaqafi; –671), was a prominent companion of Muhammad and was known as one of the four 'shrewds of the Arabs' (duhat al-Arab).  He belonged to the tribe of Thaqif of Ta'if, who were part of the early Islamic elite. He served as governor of Kufa, one of the two principal Arab garrisons and administrative centers of Iraq, under Caliph Umar in 642–645. In his old age, al-Mughira was again made governor of Kufa, serving under the Umayyad caliph Mu'awiya I from 661 until his death in 671. During his second governorship, he ruled with virtual independence from the caliph.

Life

Early life
Al-Mughira was the son of Shu'ba ibn Abi Amir and belonged to the Banu Mu'attib clan of the Banu Thaqif tribe of Ta'if. His clan were the traditional protectors of the shrine of al-Lat, one of many Arabian polytheistic deities worshiped in the pre-Islamic period. His uncle was Urwah ibn Mas'ud, a companion of the Islamic prophet Muhammad. Al-Mughira offered his services to the latter in Medina after being exiled from Ta'if for assaulting and robbing his associates in their sleep while they were travelling together. Muhammad and the nascent Muslim community had taken refuge in Medina as a result of their exile from Mecca. Muhammad utilized al-Mughira to persuade the Thaqif to embrace Islam. He participated in the Muslims' attempted pilgrimage to Mecca, which was halted by the Quraysh at Hudaybiyya in April 628. Later, when Ta'if submitted to Muslim rule in 630, al-Mughira was tasked with overseeing the demolition of the al-Lat shrine.

Service under the Rashidun caliphs
Muhammad died in 632 and leadership of the emergent Muslim state passed to Abu Bakr, who kept al-Mughira in some administrative capacity. Most high-ranking government posts went to members of the Quraysh, the tribe to which Muhammad and Abu Bakr belonged. At the Battle of Yarmouk in August 636, al-Mughira lost sight in one of his eyes. Caliph Umar appointed him governor of Basra, a garrison town founded by the Arabs which was used as the springboard for the Muslim conquest of Persia.  In the Muslim traditional sources, al-Mughira is variously stated to have married and divorced 300, 700 and 1,000 women.

In 642, Umar appointed al-Mughira governor of Kufa, the other Arab garrison town of Iraq. Two years later, a former slave of al-Mughira, known as Abu Lu'lu'a, assassinated Umar while the latter was praying in Medina. Umar's successor, Caliph Uthman, kept al-Mughira as governor for another year until replacing him with Sa'd ibn Abi Waqqas. Al-Mughira retired from public life and returned to Ta'if upon the accession of Caliph Ali following Uthman's assassination in 656. From his hometown, he observed the chaotic events of the First Muslim Civil War between the supporters of Ali, who made Kufa his capital, and the bulk of the Quraysh, who opposed Ali's caliphate. When Ali and Mu'awiya ibn Abi Sufyan, the governor of Syria who had taken up the cause of avenging the death of his Umayyad kinsman Uthman, decided to settle the Battle of Siffin by arbitration in 657, al-Mughira, without invitation by either side, attended the talks at Adhruh.

Umayyad governor of Kufa
During the chaos that ensued in the aftermath of Ali's assassination in 661, al-Mughira apparently forged a letter by Mu'awiya, who had since claimed the caliphate, giving al-Mughira responsibility of leading the annual Hajj pilgrimage to the Ka'aba in Mecca. According to the orientalist Henri Lammens, al-Mughira's "shocking morals", lack of attachment to the Alids (kinsmen and partisans of Ali), non-involvement in the "jealousies of the Quraysh [sic], as well as the narrow-mindedness of the Ansar" (another faction of the Muslim elite), and membership of the "intelligent and enterprising tribe of Thaqif [sic]", all gained the attention of Mu'awiya, who reappointed him governor of Kufa in 661. Al-Mughira was known in the tradition as one of the principal "shrewds" of his era "who could get himself out of the most hopeless difficulty". Indeed, he was able to maintain relatively cordial relations with the influential Alids of Kufa and utilized them to counter their enemies, the Kharijites. The latter were composed of Ali's erstwhile supporters who defected from him as a result of the arbitration with Mu'awiya, assassinated him and continued to rebel against the authorities in Iraq. According to Lammens, "by setting them [Alids and Kharijites] against one another he rendered harmless the most dangerous elements of disorder in his province". Moreover, by "combination of mildness and astuteness, and by knowing when to shut his eyes, al-Mughira succeeded in avoiding desperate measures" against the politically turbulent factions of Iraq and was able to maintain his governorship. Al-Baladhuri mentions in his Genealogies of the Nobles (Arabic: أنساب الأشراف; Ansab al-Ashraf), that Mughira ibn Shu'ba used to say, "Allah, curse so-and-so (meaning 'Ali) for he disobeyed what is in Your Book and abandoned the sunnah of Your Prophet, divided unity, shed blood and was slain as an oppressor." He is also said to have proposed to Mu'awiya to nominate his son Yazid as his caliphal successor.

Death
Al-Mughira died of the plague sometime between 668 and 671 at the age of 70. According to the historians al-Waqidi (d. 823) and al-Mada'ini (d. 843), al-Mughira died in August or September 670. He was succeeded by Ziyad ibn Abih, whom he had groomed as his successor. Upon becoming the governor of Iraq in 694, al-Hajjaj ibn Yusuf appointed al-Mughira's sons al-Mutarrif, Urwa and Hamza his deputy governors in al-Mada'in, Kufa and Hamadhan, respectively, on account of their shared Thaqafi descent.

References

Bibliography

Companions of the Prophet
600 births
701 deaths
Banu Thaqif
People from Taif
Rashidun governors of Kufa
Umayyad governors of Kufa
7th-century people from the Umayyad Caliphate
7th-century deaths from plague (disease)
Rashidun governors of Basra
Rashidun governors of Arminiya